Leah Neale (born 1 August 1995) is an Australian competitive swimmer currently swimming for DC Trident at the International Swimming League. She competed at the 2016 Summer Olympics where she won a silver medal in the 4 × 200 metre freestyle relay. In the same event at the 2018 Commonwealth Games she won a gold medal.

World records

Short course metres

 split 1:52.67 (3rd leg), with Madison Wilson (1st leg), Mollie O'Callaghan (2nd leg), Lani Pallister (4th leg)

References

External links
 
 
 
 
 
 

1995 births
Living people
Australian female freestyle swimmers
Swimmers at the 2016 Summer Olympics
Swimmers at the 2020 Summer Olympics
Olympic swimmers of Australia
Olympic silver medalists for Australia
Olympic bronze medalists for Australia
Medalists at the 2016 Summer Olympics
Medalists at the 2020 Summer Olympics
Medalists at the FINA World Swimming Championships (25 m)
Sportspeople from Ipswich, Queensland
Olympic silver medalists in swimming
Olympic bronze medalists in swimming
World Aquatics Championships medalists in swimming
Commonwealth Games gold medallists for Australia
Commonwealth Games medallists in swimming
Swimmers at the 2018 Commonwealth Games
21st-century Australian women
Medallists at the 2018 Commonwealth Games